Brice Vounang (born December 3, 1982) is a Cameroonian professional basketball player. Vounang signed with Étendard de Brest of the French League for the 2009-10 season.

College career
Born in Baleveng, Cameroon, Vounang played two years of NCAA basketball at the University of San Diego after two years of junior college at Eastern Oklahoma State Junior College.  In his first season with the Toreros, Vounang averaged 16.9 points per game and 6.8 rebounds per game en route to being named West Coast Conference newcomer of the year.  He followed that up with a senior season in which he averaged 15.1 points per game and 7.5 rebounds per game.

Pro career
Vounang began his pro career with one season with Pepinster Go-Pass of the Belgian Professional League.  From there, Vounang moved on to French squad Etoile Charleville-Mezieres.  In 2008-09, he had his best professional season, averaging 13.9 points per game and 7.5 rebounds per game for the squad.  Following this season, he signed with fellow French squad Étendard de Brest.

Cameroon national team
Vounang is captain of the Cameroon national basketball team.  He averaged 12.3 points and 7 rebounds per game for the 2007 squad that won the silver medal and a berth in the FIBA World Olympic Qualifying Tournament for Men 2008.  Vounang also played on the 2009 FIBA Africa Championship team that finished just off the podium in fourth place.

References

1982 births
Living people
Cameroonian men's basketball players
Cameroonian expatriate basketball people in the United States
Junior college men's basketball players in the United States
Power forwards (basketball)
RBC Pepinster players
San Diego Toreros men's basketball players